Brigitte Kuhlmann (1947–1976) was a founding member of the West German left-wing terrorist group Revolutionäre Zellen (RZ, or Revolutionary Cells in English). She was killed by the Israel Defense Forces in Entebbe, Uganda, during Operation Entebbe.

Early life
Kuhlmann was born in 1947 and studied pedagogy in Hannover. She wrote poetry and cared for handicapped patients, living with but never marrying Wilfried Böse and later Gerd Schnepel.

Frankfurt underground
Kuhlmann and Böse eventually disappeared into the Frankfurt underground, socialising in left-wing circles where they were recruited into the Red Army Faction and were founding members of Revolutionary Cells.

Air France 139 hijacking
On 27 June 1976, using an Ecuadorian passport Kuhlmann originally boarded a flight in Bahrain along with  Abdul-Rahim Jaber, and Jayel Naji al-Arjam en route to Athens, Greece to connect with an Air France flight. Baggage handlers at the airport in Bahrain ensured their firearms and grenades were smuggled onto the aircraft undetected in their carry-on luggage.

In Athens they transferred to the Air France aircraft, an Airbus A300 which took off for Paris as Flight 139 shortly after midday. Within minutes Kuhlmann and her accomplices hijacked the aircraft. Kuhlmann took control of the first class cabin and pistol-whipped noncompliant passengers. The airliner was re-routed to Libya under the call sign "Haifa One". After landing at Benina International Airport, where some passengers were released, the hijacked A300 took off again, headed south into Central Africa. During the five-hour flight, Kuhlmann verbally abused passengers, some Israeli, with anti-Semitic criticism. She was referred to by the hostages as the "Nazi terrorist," and while all of the foreign hostages were set free, she refused to allow four Jewish passengers who were Belgians and Americans to be set free after she witnessed them wearing Jewish prayer shawls.

The aircraft landed at Entebbe, Uganda where Kuhlmann and her team were met by associates in the country, including a man identified by the press as Anton Degas Bouvier (but probably Fouad Awad), Abdel al-Latif, and Abu Ali. During the week-long standoff Kuhlmann and her associates made demands of Israel, including the release of Palestinian political prisoners, as well as a ransom from France. They also demanded the release of their allies Werner Hoppe, Jan-Carl Raspe, Ingrid Schubert, Ralf Reinders, Fritz Teufel, and Inge Viett. Israelis were separated from non-Israelis and the threat of execution was made if the demands were not met.

Operation Entebbe
Kuhlmann, along with her fellow terrorist Wilfried Böse and the other hijackers, were killed in Operation Entebbe, the successful Israeli commando raid to free the remaining hostages. They died without firing a shot.

In popular culture
Kuhlmann is portrayed by Austrian-born American actress Bibi Besch in the made-for-TV film Victory at Entebbe (1976). In the fim, her character is credited as German Woman.
Kuhlmann is played by Austrian actress Sybil Danning in the film Mivtsa Yonatan (1977; literally Operation Jonathan, called Operation Thunderbolt in English-speaking markets). In the film, her name is Halima.
Kuhlmann is played by American actress Mariclare Costello in the made-for-TV film Raid on Entebbe (1977). Her character is named Gabrielle Krieger in the film.
Kuhlmann is portrayed by Katharina Schüttler in Carlos (2010).
Kuhlmann is portrayed by Rosamund Pike in Entebbe (2018, called 7 Days in Entebbe in Canada and the US).

References

1947 births
1976 deaths
German anti-Zionists
Deaths by firearm in Uganda
Members of the Revolutionary Cells (German group)
Operation Entebbe
Hijackers